The 1996 PPG/Firestone Indy Lights Championship Powered By Buick consisted of 12 races. Canadian David Empringham captured three wins on his way to the championship.

Calendar

Race summaries

Homestead race
Held March 3 at Homestead-Miami Speedway. David Empringham won the pole.

Top Five Results
 David Empringham
 Chris Simmons
 Mark Hotchkis
 David DeSilva
 Jeff Ward

Long Beach race
Held April 14 at Long Beach, California Street Course. Gualter Salles won the pole.

Top Five Results
 David Empringham
 Tony Kanaan
 Gualter Salles
 Hélio Castro-Neves
 Alex Padilla

Nazareth race
Held April 28 at Nazareth Speedway. Claude Bourbonnais won the pole.

Top Five Results
 David DeSilva
 David Empringham
 Mark Hotchkis
 Chris Simmons
 Jeff Ward

Michigan race
Held May 25 at Michigan International Speedway. David Empringham won the pole.

Top Five Results
 David Empringham
 Mark Hotchkis
 Jeff Ward
 Robby Unser
 Hélio Castro-Neves

Milwaukee race
Held June 2 at The Milwaukee Mile. Mark Hotchkis won the pole.

Top Five Results
 Mark Hotchkis
 Greg Ray
 David Empringham
 Gualter Salles
 Chris Simmons

Detroit race
Held June 9 at Belle Isle Raceway. David Empringham won the pole.

Top Five Results
 Tony Kanaan
 Alex Padilla
 Claude Bourbonnais
 José Luis Di Palma
 Jaki Scheckter

Portland race
Held June 23 at Portland International Raceway. Tony Kanaan won the pole.

Top Five Results
 Gualter Salles
 Alex Padilla
 David Empringham
 Claude Bourbonnais
 Tony Kanaan

Cleveland race
Held June 30 at Burke Lakefront Airport. Mark Hotchkis won the pole.

Top Five Results
 Gualter Salles
 Claude Bourbonnais
 Hélio Castro-Neves
 Nick Firestone
 Hideki Noda

Toronto race
Held July 14 at Exhibition Place. Jeff Ward won the pole.

Top Five Results
 Gualter Salles
 Claude Bourbonnais
 Hideki Noda
 Shigeaki Hattori
 Alex Padilla

Trois-Rivières race
Held August 4 at the Trois-Rivières, Quebec Street Circuit. Hélio Castro-Neves won the pole.

Top Five Results
 Hélio Castro-Neves
 Tony Kanaan
 Alex Padilla
 David Empringham
 Bertrand Godin

Vancouver race
Held September 1 at Pacific Place. Jeff Ward won the pole.

Top Five Results
 Claude Bourbonnais
 Tony Kanaan
 Jeff Hotchkis
 Alex Padilla
 David Empringham

Laguna Seca race
Held September 8 at Mazda Raceway Laguna Seca. Tony Kanaan won the pole.

Top Five Results
 Tony Kanaan
 Hélio Castro-Neves
 Claude Bourbonnais
 Alex Padilla
 Jeff Ward

Final points standings

Driver

For every race the points were awarded: 20 points to the winner, 16 for runner-up, 14 for third place, 12 for fourth place, 10 for fifth place, 8 for sixth place, 6 seventh place, winding down to 1 points for 12th place. Additional points were awarded to the pole winner (1 point) and to the driver leading the most laps (1 point).

Complete Overview

R21=retired, but classified NS=did not start NQ=did not qualify (18)=place after practice, but grid position not held free

References 

Indy Lights seasons
Indy Lights Season, 1996
Indy Lights
Indy Lights